Üzümlü is a village in the municipality of Əmirxanlı in the Davachi Rayon of Azerbaijan.

References

Populated places in Shabran District